Loogootee High School is a public high school in Loogootee, Indiana, United States. It serves grades 9-12 for the Loogootee Community School Corporation.

Academics
In the 2020 U.S. News & World Report survey of high schools, Loogootee ranked 45th in Indiana and 2,915th nationally.

Demographics
The demographic breakdown of the 288 students enrolled for the 2018-19 school year was: 
Male - 56.25%
Female - 43.75%
Asian - 1.4%
Hispanic - 1.4%
White - 94.8%
Multiracial - 2.1%
59.0% of the students were eligible for free or reduced-cost lunch. For 2018-19, Loogootee was a Title I school.

Athletics
Loogootee's Lions compete in the Blue Chip Conference. School colors are black and gold. The following Indiana High School Athletic Association (IHSAA) sanctioned sports were offered for 2019-20:

Baseball (boys) 
Basketball (girls and boys) 
Boys state champion - 2012
Girls state champion - 2020
Cross country (girls and boys) 
Golf (boys) 
Softball (girls) 
Tennis (girls and boys) 
Track and field (girls and boys) 
Unified flag football (coed)
Volleyball (girls)

Notable alumni
 Patrick Summers (born August 14, 1963) is an American conductor best known for his work with Houston Grand Opera (HGO), where he has been the artistic and music director since 2011, and with San Francisco Opera, where he served as principal guest conductor, 1999–2016.
 Mark Riggins, Major League Baseball (MLB) pitching coach
 Jack Butcher, Indiana's former all-time winningest high school basketball coach. Played college basketball at Memphis State, and was selected by the Boston Celtics with the 75th pick in the 1957 NBA Draft.
 Taylor Wittmer, Collegiate Volleyball player at Indiana University and Patricia L, Roy Mental Attitude Award Winner.
 Jim Trout, 1970 IHSAA Boys Basketball Arthur L. Trester Award Winner.
 Chelsie Sutton, 2020 IHSAA Girls Basketball Class 1A Patricia L. Roy Mental Attitude Award Winner.
 Gabrielle Ritchey, IHSAA Softball Stolen Bases Record (Career).
Wyatt Street, known for the shot heard around Martin County 
Jaelyn Walker, 2021 IHSAA Girls Volleyball Class 1A Mental Attitude Award Winner.

See also
 List of high schools in Indiana

References

External links

High schools in Southwestern Indiana
Public high schools in Indiana
Blue Chip Conference
Schools in Martin County, Indiana